Matti Mattsson (born 5 October 1993 in Pori, Finland) is a Finnish swimmer. At the 2012 Summer Olympics, he competed in the Men's 200 metre breaststroke, finishing in 17th place overall in the heats and failing to qualify for the semifinals. In Barcelona at the 2013 Swimming World Championships, he won bronze medal in Men's 200 metre breaststroke. He has qualified to represent Finland at the 2020 Summer Olympics.
He won bronze medal at the 2020 Summer Olympics in Men's 200 metre breaststroke.

In January 2022, Mattsson was named the 2021 Sports Personality of the Year.

References

External links 
 
 

1993 births
Living people
Sportspeople from Pori
Finnish male breaststroke swimmers
Male breaststroke swimmers
Olympic swimmers of Finland
Olympic bronze medalists for Finland
Olympic bronze medalists in swimming
Swimmers at the 2010 Summer Youth Olympics
Swimmers at the 2012 Summer Olympics
Swimmers at the 2016 Summer Olympics
Swimmers at the 2020 Summer Olympics
Medalists at the 2020 Summer Olympics
World Aquatics Championships medalists in swimming
20th-century Finnish people
21st-century Finnish people
European Aquatics Championships medalists in swimming